The molecular formula C22H30O5 (molar mass: 374.47 g/mol, exact mass: 374.2093 u) may refer to:

 Etiprednol
 Guanacastepene A
 Jasmolin II
 Methylprednisolone
 Nandrolone hydrogen succinate, or nandrolone hemisuccinate

Molecular formulas